DNSimple is a managed domain name server service operated by Aetrion LLC d/b/a DNSimple, which offers DNS hosting, domain registration, and SSL certificates. DNSimple is also an ICANN-accredited domain registrar.

History 

DNSimple was founded in 2010 by Anthony Eden and Darrin Eden. The first public version of the service was launched in July 2010 and it only offered managed DNS. Domain registration was added later, in September 2010, in partnership with Enom.

In November 2011, DNSimple announced a new proprietary DNS record type called ALIAS which provides a CNAME-like DNS record for the apex domain.

In September 2012, DNSimple acquired RoboDomain, Inc. which provided a domain management service (RoboDomain) and a WHOIS software as a service (RoboWhois). Simone Carletti, the RoboDomain, Inc. founder joined DNSimple as the first official full-time employee of DNSimple. RoboDomain was discontinued at the end of 2013.

In December 2013, DNSimple migrated all the customers from unicast to a new anycast network composed of 5 points of presence.

In December 2014, DNSimple fell victim to a major distributed denial-of-service (DDOS) attack across the entire network, that resulted in several hours of downtime. As part of the mitigation plans, the company decided to review the implementation of the secondary DNS support which was released at the begin of 2015.

Company 
DNSimple is a US company, however the company is completely decentralized and all team members are remote workers. The company's DNS service is one of the most actively used with Let's Encrypt's DNS Challenge Validation as seen in its download numbers on Docker Hub.

DNSimple for Enterprise 
DNSimple for Enterprise provides a secure domain provider, trustworthy DNS hosting, and excellent domain management. In addition, enterprise-level DNS management service with DNSimple provides solutions not offered by most domain registrars.

DDoS Defense includes two-factor authentication enforcement (2FA) and DNSSEC. Also, with multiple points of presence worldwide, DDoS (Distributed Denial of Service) defense, and Secondary DNS.

References

External links 
 
 Official blog
 DNSimple on GitHub

Internet technology companies of the United States
American companies established in 2010
Alternative Internet DNS services
Web services